L.A.Y.L.A.H. Antirecords is a defunct Belgian record label, started by Marc Monin, notable for releasing early work from several renowned industrial/experimental artists such as Coil, Nurse With Wound, Current 93 and Laibach.

L.A.Y.L.A.H. operated as a sub-label of Les Disques du Crépuscule for manufacturing and distribution, but A&R was independent of Crépuscule.

Catalog

References
Discogs entry

Belgian record labels
Record labels established in 1984
Record labels disestablished in 1989
Experimental music record labels